Larisa Angela Bakurova (commonly shortened to , Ruìshā; born February 21, 1985) is a Ukrainian-born Taiwanese actress and model. Besides her modeling engagements, she has appeared in supporting roles in the Taiwanese drama They Kiss Again and the film [[Don't Go Breaking My Heart (2011 film)|Don't Go Breaking My Heart]]. In 2012, Bakurova starred in the film Young Dudes'' directed by DJ Chen Yin-Jung.

Bakurova was a professional rhythmic gymnast from ages 3–15 and won numerous national competitions. She was Miss Kyiv at the age of 18. Bakurova is a graduate of Odessa National Economics University, where she holds a master's degree in economics. 

In 2013, Bakurova obtained the Taiwan Permanent Resident Certificate and began the naturalization process. She married a Taiwanese national in 2015 and gave birth to a daughter in 2016. On January 24, 2019, Bakurova became the first naturalized Taiwanese citizen of Ukrainian descent, which required a long process to renounce her Ukrainian citizenship since Ukraine does not have a consulate in Taiwan.

References

External links 

 
 Official facebook
 

1985 births
Living people
Ukrainian female models
Ukrainian film actresses
Ukrainian television actresses
Taiwanese film actresses
Taiwanese television actresses
21st-century Ukrainian actresses
21st-century Taiwanese actresses
Naturalised citizens of Taiwan
Odesa National Economics University alumni
Emigrants from Ukraine to Taiwan